Alberto Raposo Jiménez (born 16 November 1987) is a Dominican Republic male badminton player. In 2011, he competed at the 2011 Pan American Games in Guadalajara, and in 2014 he also competed at the Central American and Caribbean Games in Veracruz, Mexico. He was the bronze medalist at the 2013 Pan Am Badminton Championships in the men's doubles event partnered with Nelson Javier.

Achievements

Pan Am Championships
Men's Doubles

BWF International Challenge/Series
Men's Doubles

 BWF International Challenge tournament
 BWF International Series tournament
 BWF Future Series tournament

References

External links
 

1987 births
Living people
Dominican Republic male badminton players
Badminton players at the 2011 Pan American Games
Pan American Games competitors for the Dominican Republic
Competitors at the 2014 Central American and Caribbean Games
Competitors at the 2010 Central American and Caribbean Games
20th-century Dominican Republic people
21st-century Dominican Republic people